Synnyr is a mountain massif in Irkutsk Oblast and Buryatia, Russian Federation. The range is part of the Baikal Rift Zone.

There is potash mining in the range at the Synnyr mine.

Geography
It is limited by the valleys of the Chaya and Mama rivers. The Chuya, Kholodnaya, Tyya and Olokit have their sources in the range.

Flora
The lower slopes of the range are mainly covered by larch taiga, with mountain tundra and bare rocky summits (golets) at higher elevations.

See also
Baikal Rift Zone
List of mountains and hills of Russia

References

Mountain ranges of Russia
Mountains of Irkutsk Oblast
Mountains of Buryatia
South Siberian Mountains

pl:Synnyr
ru:Сынныр